Bagdad is a census-designated place (CDP) in Santa Rosa County, Florida, United States. The population was 1,490 at the 2000 census. It is part of the Pensacola–Ferry Pass–Brent Metropolitan Statistical Area.

History
Bagdad had its start in 1840 when a settler established a sawmill there. The community was named after Baghdad, Iraq. A post office called Bagdad has been in operation since 1887.

Geography
Bagdad is located at  (30.595790, -87.035622).

The area was hard hit by Hurricane Dennis in 2005.

Demographics

As of the census of 2000, there were 1,490 people, 587 households, and 406 families residing in the CDP. The racial makeup of the CDP was 80.00% White, 13.62% African American, 1.21% Native American, 0.40% Asian, 0.07% Pacific Islander, 0.47% from other races, and 4.23% from two or more races. Hispanic or Latino of any race were 1.88% of the population.

There were 587 households, out of which 28.6% had children under the age of 18 living with them, 50.3% were married couples living together, 14.5% had a female householder with no husband present, and 30.7% were non-families. 26.1% of all households were made up of individuals, and 11.2% had someone living alone who was 65 years of age or older.  The average household size was 2.50 and the average family size was 2.93.

In the CDP, the population was spread out, with 23.8% under the age of 18, 7.7% from 18 to 24, 27.9% from 25 to 44, 24.4% from 45 to 64, and 16.2% who were 65 years of age or older.  The median age was 39 years. For every 100 females, there were 94.8 males.  For every 100 females age 18 and over, there were 89.8 males.

The median income for a household in the CDP was $32,313, and the median income for a family was $46,786. Males had a median income of $30,104 versus $22,604 for females. The per capita income for the CDP was $15,980.  About 13.5% of families and 22.5% of the population were below the poverty line, including 36.7% of those under age 18 and 12.6% of those age 65 or over.

Notable people
 Justus Smith Stearns, industrialist
 Bubba Watson, professional golfer, winner of the Masters Tournament in 2012 and 2014.

References

External links
 Santa Rosa Medical Center the primary provider of hospital-based healthcare services and emergency medicine in the Bagdad area

Pensacola metropolitan area
Census-designated places in Santa Rosa County, Florida
Census-designated places in Florida